Raja Rani lake is a lake and orchid sanctuary located at Letang Municipality, the North of the Morang District, Province No. 1. The area is a wetland, surrounded by Sal (Shorea robusta) forest and lake is stream-fed but a dam regulates the water reserves, therefore, the lake is classified as semi-natural freshwater lake. Of the three ponds, Raja Pokhari, Rani Pokhari, and Rajkumari Pokhari, Rani Pokhari has  of dense forest growing up from the water, and its orchid-rich habitat is a center of attraction.

This places occupies two temples; Raja Rani Temple and Dhimal's Temple.

References 

Morang District
Lakes of Koshi Province